Skyles may refer to:

Places
Skyles, West Virginia, an unincorporated community, United States
Skyles Creek, a stream, West Virginia, United States

People
Charles Skyles, an American politician
N. H. Skyles, an American football coach
Ethel Skyles Alexander (1925-2016), an American politician

Other
Skyles Electric Works

See also
Scyles, a Scythian king who lived around 500 BC